Franklin Archibold (born 24 August 1997) is a Panamanian cyclist, who currently rides for UCI Continental team .

Major results

2014
 3rd Road race, National Junior Road Championships
2016
 1st  Road race, National Under-23 Road Championships
 1st Stage 4 Tour Ciclístico de Panamá
 3rd Road race, National Road Championships
2017
 National Road Championships
1st  Time trial
3rd Road race
 National Under-23 Road Championships
1st  Time trial
2nd Road race
 1st Stage 10 Vuelta a Chiriquí
 3rd  Road race, Central American Games
 3rd Overall Tour Ciclístico de Panamá
1st Stages 1, 5 & 6
2018
 National Road Championships
1st  Time trial
4th Road race
 National Under-23 Road Championships
1st  Road race
1st  Time trial
 3rd Overall Tour Ciclístico de Panamá
2019
 1st  Overall Vuelta a Chiriquí
1st Stages 4, 6 (ITT) & 7
2020
 Central American Road Championships
2nd  Road race
2nd  Time trial
 2nd Time trial, National Road Championships
 3rd Overall Vuelta a Chiriquí
1st Stage 5
2021
 National Road Championships
1st  Road race
2nd Time trial
 Central American Road Championships 
 1st  Time trial
 3rd  Road race
 3rd Grand Prix Gündoğmuş
 7th Grand Prix Velo Alanya
2022 
 1st Stage 2 Vuelta a Guatemala
 3rd Overall Vuelta a Formosa Internacional
 5th Grand Prix Megasaray
 5th Grand Prix Mediterranean

References

External links

Panamanian male cyclists
1997 births
Living people